Margate Airport is an airport in Margate, KwaZulu-Natal, South Africa . The airport is welcomed by many tourists (including local and international) and provides a convenient alternative to King Shaka International Airport in Durban.

It only has one schedule flight service which is the Margate- Johannesburg route provided by CemAir. The airport also has charter flights, scenic flips and microlight flips.

Upgrade
In 2020, a R10 million upgrade to Margate Airport was funded by the Department of Economic Development, Tourism and Environmental Affairs. The upgrade which began in June 2020, included expanding the arrivals terminal, refurbishing ablution facilities, the addition of a new building for car rental and the construction of a controlled paid parking area. The project was expected to finish in December 2020 however it has not been completed but was being finalized in February 2021. Due to abnormal rainfall over the summer period, construction work was temporarily halted however the upgrade is expected to be finished in July 2021.

Airlines and destinations

Aviation 
 Non-directional beacon - UR485.0
 Pilot Controlled Lighting - 7 clicks on 122.7
Flight School and Training - Zero Four Air School - www.flymargate.com
 Fuel and Oil types available - Avgas 100LL, Jet A1, Oil - W100 Exxon

See also 
 Margate

References

External links
FLY MARGATE

Airports in South Africa
Transport in KwaZulu-Natal
Ugu District Municipality